Raorchestes uthamani is a species of frog of the genus Raorchestes found in Gavi, Pathanamthitta district, in the Western Ghats of Kerala in India. The species is named after two naturalists, bird photographer, P.K. Uthaman, and Deputy Conservator of Forests, K.V. Uthaman.

References

External links
 

uthamani
Frogs of India
Endemic fauna of the Western Ghats
Amphibians described in 2011